Forgotten Four: The Integration of Pro Football is a documentary about athletes Kenny Washington, Woody Strode, Marion Motley and Bill Willis. They helped break down the barriers that existed for black athletes in  professional football. It was written by Aaron Cohen and directed by Johnson McKelvy. The film's producer was Ross Greenburg.

References

External links
 Imdb: Forgotten Four: The Integration of Pro Football
 Epix: Forgotten Four: The Integration of Pro Football

American television films
American sports documentary films
Documentary films about American football
African-American sports history
Documentary films about racism in the United States
2014 documentary films
History of American football
2014 films
2014 television films
2010s American films